The 2013 Missouri Monsters season was the first season for the professional indoor football franchise and first in the Ultimate Indoor Football League (UIFL). One of six teams that competed in the UIFL for the 2013 season.

Led by interim head coach Martino Theus, the Monsters played their home games at the Family Arena in St. Charles, Missouri.

Schedule
Key:

Regular season
All start times are local to home team

Standings

y - clinched conference title
x - clinched playoff spot

Roster

References

Missouri Monsters
Missouri Monsters
River City Raiders seasons